is a railway station on the Seibu Shinjuku Line in Nakano, Tokyo, Japan, operated by the private railway operator Seibu Railway.

Lines

History
Toritsu-Kasei Station opened on 25 December 1937. Station numbering was introduced on all Seibu Railway lines during fiscal 2012, with Toritsu-Kasei Station becoming "SS08".

Passenger statistics
In fiscal 2013, the station was the 56th busiest on the Seibu network with an average of 17,556 passengers daily.

The passenger figures for previous years are as shown below.

References

External links

Toritsu-Kasei station information 

Railway stations in Tokyo
Nakano, Tokyo
Railway stations in Japan opened in 1937